Homewood is an unincorporated community in Franklin County, Kansas, United States.

History
Homewood was located on the Atchison, Topeka and Santa Fe Railway. In 1900, it contained a population of about 100 inhabitants. Around this time, a number of stores operated out of the small town, and it also had its own school.

The Homewood post office closed in 1955.

Geography

References

Further reading

External links
 Franklin County maps: Current, Historic, KDOT

Unincorporated communities in Franklin County, Kansas
Unincorporated communities in Kansas